Vapileh (also Romanized as Vāpīleh) is a village in Salehan Rural District, in the Central District of Khomeyn County, Markazi Province, Iran. At the 2006 census, its population was 66, in 25 families.

References 

Populated places in Khomeyn County